Giraffokeryx is an extinct genus of medium-sized giraffids known from the Miocene of the Indian subcontinent and Eurasia.  It is distinguished from other giraffids by the four ossicones on its head; one pair in front of the eyes on the anterior aspect of the frontal bone and the other behind the eyes in the frontoparietal region overhanging the temporal fossae.  It has a brachydont dentition like in other giraffids and its legs and feet are of medium length.<ref>{{cite journal |last1=Bhatti |first1=Z.H. |last2=Khan |first2=M.A. |last3=Khan |first3=A.M. |last4=Akhtar |first4=M. |last5=Ghaffar |first5=A. |last6=Iqbal |first6=M. |last7=Ikram |first7=T. |title=Giraffokeryx (Artiodactyla: Mammalia) remains from the lower Siwaliks of Pakistan |date=December 2012 |journal=Pakistan Journal of Zoology |issue=44:6 |pages=1623–1631 |url=http://zsp.com.pk/pdf44/1623-1631%20_22_%20PJZ-618-11%209-10-12%20checked.pdf |id=824419715}}</ref>Giraffokeryx is considered monotypic by most authors, in the form of G. punjabiensis, but other species have been assigned to the genus:
 G. chinjensis was assigned to the genus, but later included within the extinct species Giraffa priscilla.  The distribution of this latter species and G. punjabiensis indicates that the Himalayas still did not act as a barrier for faunal dispersal during the middle Miocene.
 G. anatoliensis, a partial skull with a postorbital horn and isolated teeth from Turkey, had shorter and less inclined horns than G. punjabiensis.Giraffokeryx resembled either an okapi or a small giraffe. It is a possible ancestor of both.

See also

 Hydaspitherium''

References

Further reading

Prehistoric giraffes
Prehistoric even-toed ungulate genera
Miocene even-toed ungulates
Miocene mammals of Europe
Miocene mammals of Asia
Fossil taxa described in 1910